The Maurice Filion Trophy is awarded annually to the general manager of the Year in the Quebec Major Junior Hockey League. It was first awarded in 2005–06.

Winners

External links
 QMJHL official site List of trophy winners 

Quebec Major Junior Hockey League trophies and awards